José Ramón Larraz Gil (1929 – 3 September 2013) was a Spanish director of exploitation and horror films such as the erotic and bloody Vampyres (1974).

Biography

Early life
Born in Barcelona, Larraz earned a Doctor of Philosophy degree and moved to Paris in 1952, where he started his career as a comics writer for magazines like Pilote and Spirou. His most known creation was the action-comic series "Paul Foran", which he wrote under the name "Gil" and also made some artistic contributions to.

Career
Larraz moved to England, where he began making films, then in 1976 apparently relocated his operations back to Spain. He made many different types of films, but is best known for his horror films. Symptoms was an official British entry at the 1974 Cannes Film Festival.  His last few horror films were Spanish-American co-productions. He apparently retired from filmmaking in 1992 at age 63.

Death
Larraz died, aged 84, in Málaga on 3 September 2013.

Filmography

Further reading
The book Immoral Tales: European Sex & Horror Movies 1956-1984 (1994) by Cathal Tohill and Pete Tombs dedicates a chapter to him.
The paperback film novelisation Vampyres (FAB Press, 2001) by Tim Greaves.
Vampyres: A Tribute to the Ultimate in Erotic Horror Cinema (1996) by Tim Greaves is devoted entirely to the making of the film, filled with interview material, reviews and a treasure trove of photos.

References

Sources

External links

Lambiek - info on Larraz career as a comics writer
Obituary (Spanish)

1929 births
2013 deaths
Spanish film directors
Spanish comics writers
Spanish comics artists